WHOG-FM (95.7 FM) is a radio station broadcasting a classic rock format. Licensed to Ormond-By-The-Sea, Florida, the station serves the Daytona Beach metropolitan area.  The station is owned by Southern Stone Communications.  The radio studios and offices are on LPGA Boulevard in Daytona Beach.  WHOG-FM plays a mix of classic rock of the 1970s and 1980s as well as 1990s and early 2000s rock.

The station has an effective radiated power (ERP) of 48,000 watts.  The transmitter is off Wesley Street in Daytona Beach.  WHOG-FM broadcasts using HD Radio technology.  The digital subchannel of WHOG-FM-HD2 plays urban contemporary music, and is known as Hot Daytona 94.1.  It feeds FM translator W231CN at 94.1 MHz.

History
WHOG was acquired in 1996 from Root Communications as radio station WTSM changing the call letters and format. WTSM was operating as a Westwood One 1970s format station. Black Crow Media would later change its format to Classic Rock.

In late 2008, WHOG-FM dropped the "Classic Rock" designation and started classifying itself as simply "Rock Radio".

In January 2013, ownership of WHOG-FM was transferred to Southern Stone Communications.

References

External links

HOG-FM
Radio stations established in 1995
Classic rock radio stations in the United States
1995 establishments in Florida